Turabaz Khan (1885–1982) was a general who served in the Afghan National Army. He was born in Kabul to a Safi Pashtun family. He was educated at a military school in Kabul. He also served an associate to the Sardar Mohammad Hashim Khan (King) Mohammed Zahir Shah’s uncle and Afghanistan’s Royal Prime Minister in 1929. He also served as Kabul’s Police Commander and Chief of Security until his retirement in 1946.

He died in 1982 in Kabul. A crossroads near his house (Char-Rahi Turabaz Khan) (چهارراهی طره بازخان – شهرنو، کابل) in the Shahr Naw section of Kabul is named after him.

References

Afghan military personnel
Pashtun people
1885 births
1981 deaths
Afghan military officers